Khramov or Hramov (from храм meaning temple) is a Russian male surname, its feminine counterpart is Khramova or Hramova. It may refer to
Aleksandr Khramov (born 1989), Russian football player
Andrey Khramov (born 1981), Russian orienteering competitor
Tatyana Khramova (born 1970), Belarusian Olympic high jumper